Surendra florimel, the Eastern acacia blue  a species of lycaenid or hairstreak butterfly found in South-East Asia.

Range
Southern Burma, the Malay Peninsula, Sumatra, Java, Nias and Borneo.

Description
In the male, the wings above are deep shining purplish blue, with a black apical border on the forewing, and on the hindwing both the costal and inner margins are broadly black bordered. The female is plain brown, with diffuse darker borders. The underside is brown, with a darker brown band across the wing from apex to the middle of the dorsum.

References

Arhopalini
Butterflies of Borneo
Butterflies described in 1889